Ali Sulaiman Rashid Al-Busaidi (born 21 January 1991), commonly known as Ali Al-Busaidi, is an Omani footballer who plays for Al-Seeb Club in the Oman Professional League.

Club career

Youth career
Born and raised in Sohar, Oman, Ali began his footballing career with his hometown, Sohar-based club, Sohar SC in 2005. He represented Sohar in various national tournaments at all the junior levels till 2009.

Sohar
Ali began his professional footballing career in 2009 with his parent club and Oman First Division League side, Sohar. Impressing the technical staff with his diverse style of play, he earned the captain's armband at various occasions throughout his stint at the Sohar-based club. He scored 7 goals in 58 appearances in his three-year spell at the club.

Saham
In early 2012, he moved to Saham where he signed a one-year contract with 2011–12 Oman First Division League winners and Oman Elite League side, Saham SC. In the 2012–13 Oman Elite League, he scored 3 goals in 23 appearances helping his side secure the 3rd position in the championship.

Back to Sohar
Successfully earning promotion to Oman Professional League and hoping to play in the top level for a long time, Sohar SC's management decided to recruit some top quality nationals of which Ali, who was now in the good books of Oman's French manager, Paul Le Guen, was a part. Sohar SC, thus managed to obtain the services of this youngster who was famous for his capability of switching and getting adapted to various positions on the field. Adhering to the club's agenda, Ali who also served as the captain of the team in a number of games, helped his side secure the 7th position in the 2013–14 Oman Professional League which included a 2-1 win against the potential champions, Al-Nahda Club and a 1-0 win over Omani giants, Dhofar S.C.S.C.

Al-Nahda
Impressed with his vibrant display, defending champions of Oman Professional League and 2014 GCC Champions League semi-finalists, Al-Nahda on 7 October 2014 managed in obtaining the services of Omani international for the 2014–15 Oman Professional League. In his very first appearance for the Al-Buraimi-based side, he helped them win the 2014 Oman Super Cup with a 6-5 penalty win over Omani giants, Fanja SC.

He appeared in his side's 2015 AFC Champions League qualifying play-off match against Qatar's El Jaish SC which was won 2-1 by the home side at the Thani bin Jassim Stadium in Doha, Qatar.

Dhofar
On 5 June 2016, he signed a two-year contract with Omani giants, Dhofar Club He made his first appearance in the 2016-17 Oman Professional League on 17 September 2016 in a 2-1 win over Muscat Club and scored his first goal on 23 November 2016 in a 2-1 loss against his former side, Al-Nahda. He helped his side win the Oman Professional League for the historic 10th time after a long gap of 13 years making appearances in all the league games and playing a vital role in his team's success. He also led his side to the finals of the 2016-17 Sultan Qaboos Cup where they unfortunately lost to Al-Suwaiq Club in the finals.

Al-Suwaiq
Soon after the 2016-17 season, news speculated that a lot of sides in the Oman Professional League are looking to have the services of Ali for the next season, with Al-Suwaiq Club behind ahead of others in the race. The speculations came to an end when on June 16, 2017 he signed a one-year contract with 2016-17 Sultan Qaboos Cup winners, Al-Suwaiq. He was adjudged the man of the match in his official debut for Al-Suwaiq in a 2-1 loss against his former side Dhofar in the 2017 Oman Super Cup. He made his first appearance in the 2017-18 Oman Professional League on 13 September 2017 in a 2-1 win over one of his former clubs, Saham. Later in 2018, Al-Busaidi helped his side lift the coveted Oman Professional League trophy after a long wait of 5 years.

Club career statistics

International career
Ali is part of the first team squad of the Oman national football team. He was selected for the national team for the first time in 2013. He made his first appearance for Oman on 9 October 2013 in a friendly match against Mauritania. He scored his first goal on 30 March 2015 in a 4-1 loss against African giants, Algeria as he came on as a second-half substitute for Qasim Said when Oman was trailing by 2 goals. With the score being 4-0 in favor of Algeria, Al-Busaidi converted a chance for his team 15 minutes before the final whistle. He has also scored a goal for the national side in a 2-0 win in an unofficial friendly match against Football League Championship side, Reading F.C. and also assisted the first goal for his side in the match.

WAFF Championship
He has 2 appearances in the 2014 WAFF Championship which include a 0-0 draw against Bahrain and a 0-0 draw against Iraq.

Asian Cup
He appeared for the national side twice in the 2015 AFC Asian Cup qualification, once in a 0-0 draw against Jordan  and later in a 3-1 win over Singapore, helping his side top the Group A and hence qualify for the 2015 Asian Cup. He made his AFC Asian Cup debut on 10 January 2015 in a narrow 1-0 loss against Asian giants, South Korea.

Gulf Cup of Nations
He helped Oman qualify for the Semi-finals of the 2014 Gulf Cup of Nations and participated in Oman's historic 5-0 win over ten-time Gulf Cup of Nations winners, Kuwait, assisting the first and the last goal of the game, both scored by Abdulaziz Al-Muqbali.

In early 2018, Ali was instrumental in helping his nation win only its 2nd Arabian Gulf Cup title defeating the United Arab Emirates in the final on penalties following a goalless draw.

FIFA World Cup qualification
He made 5 appearances in the 2018 FIFA World Cup qualification, which include a 1-1 draw against Asian giants, Iran. In the match against the Asian giants, he assisted the first goal for his side which was scored by Saad Al-Mukhaini.

International goals
Score and Result lists Oman's goal tally first

|-
| 1. || 30 March 2015 || Suheim Bin Hamad Stadium, Doha, Qatar ||  ||  ||  || Friendly
|}

Style of play
Ali Al-Busaidi plays both an attacking role and a defensive role, most often playing as a left-back or as a winger, and is known in particular for his pace, dribbling, crossing and ability on free kicks. He is able to play on the left wing as well through the center of the pitch, making him a versatile attacker as well as defender. From a tactical standpoint, he usually plays in a free role, often drifting from the left wing into the centre when moving off the ball. Ali is known to be mentally sharp, with good vision and positioning, often predicting certain plays; he also possesses quick reactions, opportunism, balance, and agility. Although left-footed, he is also able to control the ball and cross well with his right foot.

Honours

Club
Al-Nahda
 Oman Super Cup (1): 2014

Dhofar
 Oman Professional League (1): 2016-17
 Sultan Qaboos Cup (0): Runners-up 2016-17

Al-Suwaiq
 Oman Professional League (1): 2017-18
 Oman Super Cup (0): 2017

Dhofar
 Oman Professional League (1): 2018-19

National Team
 Gulf Cup of Nations (1): 2017

References

External links
 
 Ali Al-Busaidi at Goal.com
 
 
 Ali Al-Busaidi - ASIAN CUP Australia 2015

1991 births
Living people
People from Sohar
Omani footballers
Oman international footballers
Association football defenders
2015 AFC Asian Cup players
2019 AFC Asian Cup players
Sohar SC players
Saham SC players
Al-Nahda Club (Oman) players
Dhofar Club players
Suwaiq Club players
Oman Professional League players